Orthogarantiana is an extinct genus from a well-known class of fossil cephalopods, the ammonites. It lived during the Middle Jurassic.

Distribution
Found only at Ile Crémieu, Oyster facies, France

References

Jurassic ammonites
Fossils of France
Bajocian life